Feyzi Hasan (also Romanized as Feyẕī Ḩasan; also known as Feiz Hosein) is a village in Khorram Dasht Rural District, Kamareh District, Khomeyn County, Markazi Province, Iran. At the 2006 census, its population was 50, in 13 families.

References 

Populated places in Khomeyn County